The 1872 United States presidential election in Nevada took place on November 5, 1872, as part of the 1872 United States presidential election. Voters chose three representatives, or electors to the Electoral College, who voted for president and vice president.

Nevada voted for the Republican candidate, Ulysses S. Grant, over Liberal Republican candidate Horace Greeley. Grant won Nevada by a margin of 14.86%.

Results

See also
United States presidential elections in Nevada

References

Nevada
1872
1872 Nevada elections